The Viking gas field is a group of natural gas and associated condensate fields located under the southern North Sea about 85 miles (136 km) from the Lincolnshire coast. The field was in production from 1972 to 2018.

The field 
The Viking gas field is a group of natural gas accumulations under the UK North Sea. The field is named after the area of the North Sea beneath which the field is located. The gas reservoir is a Rotliegendes sandstone of Lower to Middle Permian age, at a depth of 9,100–10,200 feet (2,773–3,110 m) with a thickness of 200–500 feet (61–150 m). The Viking structures run north-west to south-east and extend over Blocks 49/12, 49/16 and 49/17. The field was discovered in 1965 and production started in 1972. The original gas in place amounted to 79.3 billion cubic metres. Gas and associated condensate from Viking A and Viking B were both exported via the Viking A field through a 28-inch diameter pipeline to the Viking gas terminal (renamed the Theddlethorpe gas terminal in 1988), Lincolnshire. 

The Victor, Victoria and Vixen fields are adjacent to Viking and production from these fields is routed through the Viking offshore facilities.

The Viking and Victor gas compositions and properties are as follows.

Ownership 
The field was originally licensed to Conoco UK Ltd, later ConocoPhillips. In 2019 Chrysaor assumed the ownership of Conoco-Phillips North Sea Assets. In March 2021 Chrysaor Holdings merged with Premier Oil to form Harbour Energy.

Development 
The Viking field was developed through a number of offshore installations. These are summarized in the following tables.

Satellite fields 
The satellite fields which exported gas via the Viking B complex were:

Production 
The annual gas production from the Viking field (in millions of standard cubic feet) was:

Export from the Viking B field was originally routed to the shore terminal via Viking AR. From 2009 export was re-routed to shore via the LOGGS installation.

Decommissioning 
The Viking A field (Viking North) was decommissioned as uneconomical in 1991. The A field platforms (except AR) were removed in 1993–4.

Viking CD, DD, ED, GD & HD ceased production in 2011–15, and were removed in 2017–18.

Theddlethorpe gas terminal was permanently shut-down in August 2018. Production from all connected fields ceased.

See also 

 Indefatigable gas field

 Leman gas field
 West Sole gas field
Hewett gas field
Lincolnshire Offshore Gas Gathering System
Pickerill and Juliet gas fields
Caister Murdoch System

References 

Natural gas fields in the United Kingdom
North Sea energy